Al Hunter may refer to:
Al Hunter (writer), Anishinaabe writer
Al Hunter (American football) (Alfonse Hunter, born 1955), American football player
Al Hunter (singer) (Alan Keith Hunter), New Zealand singer-songwriter

See also
Al Hunter Ashton (1957–2007), British actor and script writer
Albert Hunter (1900–1969), British politician
Alan Hunter (disambiguation)